Masaru Amono (9 August 1942 – 28 July 2006), also known as Masaru Amano,  was a Japanese professional golfer.

Amono played on the Japan Golf Tour, winning three times. As a senior golfer, he won the 1995 Senior PGA Tour qualifying school in the United States and played on the tour in 1996. His best finishes were a pair of tied for fourths at the Cadillac NFL Golf Classic and the Northville Long Island Classic.

Professional wins (3)

Japan Golf Tour wins (3)
1978 Golf Digest Tournament
1979 Kanto Open
1983 Gunmaken Open

External links

Japanese male golfers
Japan Golf Tour golfers
PGA Tour Champions golfers
Sportspeople from Hiroshima Prefecture
1942 births
2006 deaths